Cardiopulmonary resuscitation (CPR) is an emergency procedure consisting of chest compressions often combined with artificial ventilation in an effort to manually preserve intact brain function until further measures are taken to restore spontaneous blood circulation and breathing in a person who is in cardiac arrest. It is recommended in those who are unresponsive with no breathing or abnormal breathing, for example, agonal respirations.

The rescuer may also provide artificial ventilation by either exhaling air into the subject's mouth or nose (mouth-to-mouth resuscitation) or using a device that pushes air into the subject's lungs (mechanical ventilation). Current recommendations place emphasis on early and high-quality chest compressions over artificial ventilation; a simplified CPR method involving only chest compressions is recommended for untrained rescuers. With children, however, 2015 American Heart Association guidelines indicate that doing only compressions may actually result in worse outcomes, because such problems in children normally arise from respiratory issues rather than from cardiac ones, given their young age. Chest compression to breathing ratios is set at 30 to 2 in adults.

CPR alone is unlikely to restart the heart. Its main purpose is to restore partial flow of oxygenated blood to the brain and heart. The objective is to delay tissue death and to extend the brief window of opportunity for a successful resuscitation without permanent brain damage. Administration of an electric shock to the subject's heart, termed defibrillation, is usually needed to restore a viable, or "perfusing", heart rhythm. Defibrillation is effective only for certain heart rhythms, namely ventricular fibrillation or pulseless ventricular tachycardia, rather than asystole or pulseless electrical activity, which usually require the treatment of underlying conditions to restore cardiac function. Early shock, when appropriate, is recommended. CPR may succeed in inducing a heart rhythm that may be shockable. In general, CPR is continued until the person has a return of spontaneous circulation (ROSC) or is declared dead.

Medical uses 
CPR is indicated for any person unresponsive with no breathing or breathing only in occasional agonal gasps, as it is most likely that they are in cardiac arrest. If a person still has a pulse but is not breathing (respiratory arrest) artificial ventilations may be more appropriate, but, due to the difficulty people have in accurately assessing the presence or absence of a pulse, CPR guidelines recommend that lay persons should not be instructed to check the pulse, while giving healthcare professionals the option to check a pulse. In those with cardiac arrest due to trauma, CPR is considered futile but still recommended. Correcting the underlying cause such as a tension pneumothorax or pericardial tamponade may help.

Pathophysiology 
CPR is used on people in cardiac arrest to oxygenate the blood and maintain a cardiac output to keep vital organs alive. Blood circulation and oxygenation are required to transport oxygen to the tissues. The physiology of CPR involves generating a pressure gradient between the arterial and venous vascular beds; CPR achieves this via multiple mechanisms. The brain may sustain damage after blood flow has been stopped for about four minutes and irreversible damage after about seven minutes. Typically if blood flow ceases for one to two hours, then body cells die. Therefore, in general CPR is effective only if performed within seven minutes of the stoppage of blood flow. The heart also rapidly loses the ability to maintain a normal rhythm. Low body temperatures, as sometimes seen in near-drownings, prolong the time the brain survives. Following cardiac arrest, effective CPR enables enough oxygen to reach the brain to delay brain stem death, and allows the heart to remain responsive to defibrillation attempts.

Methods 

In 2010, the American Heart Association and International Liaison Committee on Resuscitation updated their CPR guidelines. The importance of high quality CPR (sufficient rate and depth without excessively ventilating) was emphasized. The order of interventions was changed for all age groups except newborns from airway, breathing, chest compressions (ABC) to chest compressions, airway, breathing (CAB). An exception to this recommendation is for those believed to be in a respiratory arrest (airway obstruction, drug overdose, etc.). 

The most important aspects of CPR are: few interruptions of chest compressions, a sufficient speed and depth of compressions, completely relaxing pressure between compressions, and not ventilating too much. It is unclear if a few minutes of CPR before defibrillation results in different outcomes than immediate defibrillation.

Compressions with rescue breaths 
 
A normal CPR procedure uses chest compressions and ventilations. The compressions push on the bone that is in the middle of the chest (sternum) and the ventilations are made pinching the victim's nose and blowing air mouth-to-mouth. If the victim is a baby, the rescuer would make the ventilations covering the baby's mouth and nose at the same time. It is recommended for all victims of any age a general compression-to-ventilation ratio of 30:2 (30 rhythmic compressions before each 2 ventilations).

As an exception for the normal compression-to-ventilation ratio of 30:2, if at least two trained rescuers are present, and the victim is a child, a ratio of 15:2 is preferred. And, according to the AHA 2015 Guidelines, the ratio in newborns is 30:2 if one rescuer is present and 15:2 if two rescuers are present. In an advanced airway treatment, such as an endotracheal tube or laryngeal mask airway, the artificial ventilation should occur without pauses in compressions, at a rate of 1 breath every 6 to 8 seconds (8–10 ventilations per minute).

In all the victims, the compression speed is of at least 100 compressions per minute. Recommended compression depth in adults and children is of 5 cm (2 inches), and in infants it is 4 cm (1.6 inches). In adults, rescuers should use two hands for the chest compressions (one on the top of the other), while in children one hand can be enough, and with babies the rescuer must use only two fingers.

There exist some plastic shields and respirators that can be used in the rescue breaths between the mouths of the rescuer and the victim, with the purposes of sealing a better vacuum and avoiding infections.

In some cases, the patient has experienced one of the failures in the rhythm of the heart (ventricular fibrillation and ventricular tachycardia) that can be corrected with the electric shock of a defibrillator. It is important then that someone asks for the defibrillator and to use it, which would be easy, because the common models of defibrillator (the AEDs) are automatic portable machines that guide to the user with recorded voice instructions along the process, and analyze the victim, and apply the correct shocks if they are needed. Besides, there exist written instructions of defibrillators that explain how to use them step-by-step.

The recommended order of normal cardiopulmonary resuscitation is the 'CAB': first 'Chest' (chest compressions), followed by 'Airway' (attempt to open the airway by performing a head tilt and a chin lift), and 'Breathing' (rescue breaths). Anyway, as of 2010, the Resuscitation Council (UK) was still recommending an 'ABC' order if the victim is a child. It can be difficult to determine the presence or absence of a pulse, so the pulse check has been removed for common providers and should not be performed for more than 10 seconds by healthcare providers.

Compression only 
For adults with cardiac arrest, compression-only (hands-only or cardiocerebral resuscitation) CPR which involves chest compressions without artificial ventilation is recommended as the method of choice for the untrained rescuer or those who are not proficient as it is easier to perform and instructions are easier to give over a phone. In adults with out-of-hospital cardiac arrest, compression-only CPR by the lay public has an equal or higher success rate than standard CPR. It is hoped that the use of compression-only delivery will increase the chances of the lay public delivering CPR.Compression-only CPR is not as good for children who are more likely to have cardiac arrest from respiratory causes. Two reviews have found that compression-only CPR had no more success than no CPR whatsoever. Rescue breaths for children and especially for babies should be relatively gentle. Either a ratio of compressions to breaths of 30:2 or 15:2 was found to have better results for children. Both children and adults should receive a hundred chest compressions per minute. Other exceptions besides children include cases of drownings and drug overdose. In both these cases, compressions and rescue breaths are recommended if the bystander is trained and is willing to do so.

As per the American Heart Association, the beat of the Bee Gees song "Stayin' Alive" provides an ideal rhythm in terms of beats per minute to use for hands-only CPR, which is 104 beats-per-minute. One can also hum Queen's "Another One Bites the Dust", which is 110 beats-per-minute and contains a memorable repeating drum pattern. For those in cardiac arrest due to non-heart related causes and in people less than 20 years of age, standard CPR is superior to compression-only CPR.

Prone CPR 
Standard CPR is performed with the victim in supine position. Prone CPR, or reverse CPR, is performed on a victim in prone position, lying on the chest. This is achieved by turning the head to the side and compressing the back. Due to the head being turned, the risk of vomiting and complications caused by aspiration pneumonia may be reduced.

The American Heart Association's current guideline recommends performing CPR in the supine position, and limits prone CPR to situations where the patient cannot be turned.

Pregnancy
During pregnancy when a woman is lying on her back, the uterus may compress the inferior vena cava and thus decrease venous return. It is therefore recommended that the uterus be pushed to the woman's left. This can be done by placing a pillow or towel under her right hip so that she is on an angle of 15–30 degrees, and making sure their shoulders are flat to the ground. If this is not effective healthcare professionals should consider emergency resuscitative hysterotomy.

Family presence
Evidence generally supports family being present during CPR. This includes in CPR for children.

Other
Interposed abdominal compressions may be beneficial in the hospital environment. There is no evidence of benefit pre-hospital or in children.

Cooling during CPR is being studied as currently results are unclear whether or not it improves outcomes.

Internal cardiac massage is manual squeezing of the exposed heart itself carried out through a surgical incision into the chest cavity, usually when the chest is already open for cardiac surgery.

Active compression-decompression methods using mechanical decompression of the chest have not been shown to improve outcome in cardiac arrest.

CPR for Heart Attack: Airway:
If you’ve been trained in CPR after you’ve done the 30 compressions to your chest, you can open the airway for your child by performing the head-tilted chin-lift technique.
1. Place your fingers on the forehead of the child and gently tilt the child’s head to the side.
2. On the other hand, use the other hand to gently lift the cheeks forward to open the airway.
For more help.

Use of devices

Defibrillators 

Defibrillators produce a defibrillation (electric shocks) that can restore the normal heart function of the victim.

Nevertheless, they are only indicated for some arrhythmias (abnormal heart beatings), specifically ventricular fibrillation (VF) and pulseless ventricular tachycardia. Defibrillation is not indicated if the patient is conscious or has a normal pulse. Defibrillation is also not indicated if the heart has completely stopped, as in asystole or pulseless electrical activity (PEA), in those cases a normal CPR would be used to oxygenate the brain until the heart function can be restored. Improperly given electrical shocks can cause dangerous arrhythmias, such as the ventricular fibrillation (VF).

The standard defibrillation device, prepared for a fast use out of the medical centres, is the automated external defibrillator (AED), a portable machine of small size (similar to a briefcase) that can be used by any user with no previous training. That machine produces recorded voice instructions that guide to the user along the defibrillation process. It also checks the victim's condition to apply automatically electric shocks at a correct level, if they are needed. Other models are semi-automatic and need that the user push a button before producing an electric shock.

The defibrillation process is simple, but there exist written instructions of defibrillators that explain it step-by-step.

There are several devices for improving CPR but, only defibrillators (as of 2010) have been found better than standard CPR for an out-of-hospital cardiac arrest.

Devices for timing CPR 
Timing devices can feature a metronome (an item carried by many ambulance crews) to assist the rescuer in achieving the correct rate. Some units can also give timing reminders for performing compressions, ventilating and changing operators.

Devices for assisting in manual CPR 

Mechanical chest compression devices have not been found to be better than standard manual compressions. Their use is reasonable in situations where manual compressions are not safe to perform such as a moving vehicle.

Audible and visual prompting may improve the quality of CPR and prevent the decrease of compression rate and depth that naturally occurs with fatigue, and to address this potential improvement, a number of devices have been developed to help improve CPR technique.

These items can be devices to be placed on top of the chest, with the rescuer's hands going over the device, and a display or audio feedback giving information on depth, force or rate, or in a wearable format such as a glove. Several published evaluations show that these devices can improve the performance of chest compressions.

As well as its use during actual CPR on a cardiac arrest victim, which relies on the rescuer carrying the device with them, these devices can also be used as part of training programs to improve basic skills in performing correct chest compressions.

Devices for providing automatic CPR
Mechanical CPR has not seen as much use as mechanical ventilation; however, use in the prehospital setting is increasing. Devices on the market include the LUCAS device, developed at the University Hospital of Lund, and AutoPulse. Both use straps around the chest to secure the patient. The first generation of the LUCAS uses a gas-driven piston and motor-driven constricting band, while later version are battery operated.

There are several advantages to automated devices: they allow rescuers to focus on performing other interventions; they do not fatigue and begin to perform less effective compressions, as humans do; they are able to perform effective compressions in limited-space environments such as air ambulances, where manual compressions are difficult, and they allow ambulance workers to be strapped in safely rather than standing over a patient in a speeding vehicle. However the disadvantages are cost to purchase, time to train emergency personnel to use them, interruption to CPR to implement, potential for incorrect application and the need for multiple device sizes.

Several studies have shown little or no improvement in survival rates but acknowledge the need for more study.

Mobile apps for providing CPR instructions
To support training and incident management, mobile apps have been published on the largest app markets. An evaluation of 61 available apps has revealed that a large number do not follow international guidelines for basic life support and many apps are not designed in a user-friendly way. As a result, the Red Cross updated and endorsed its emergency preparedness application, which uses pictures, text and videos to assist the user.
The UK Resuscitation Council, has an app, called Lifesaver, which shows how to perform CPR.

Effectivity rate 
CPR oxygenates the body and brain, which favours making a later defibrillation and the advanced life support. Even in the case of a "non-shockable" rhythm, such as pulseless electrical activity (PEA) where defibrillation is not indicated, effective CPR is no less important. Used alone, CPR will result in few complete recoveries, though the outcome without CPR is almost uniformly fatal.

Studies have shown that immediate CPR followed by defibrillation within 3–5 minutes of sudden VF cardiac arrest dramatically improves survival. In cities such as Seattle where CPR training is widespread and defibrillation by EMS personnel follows quickly, the survival rate is about 20 percent for all causes and as high as 57 percent if a witnessed "shockable" arrest. In cities such as New York, without those advantages, the survival rate is only 5 percent for witnessed shockable arrest. Similarly in-hospital CPR is more successful when arrests are witnessed or are in the ICU or in patients wearing heart monitors, where the arrests are noticed immediately, as shown in the table and graph later in this article.

\* AED data here exclude health facilities and nursing homes, where patients are sicker than average.

In adults compression-only CPR by bystanders appears to be better than chest compressions with rescue breathing. Compression-only CPR may be less effective in children than in adults, as cardiac arrest in children is more likely to have a non-cardiac cause. In a 2010 prospective study of cardiac arrest in children (age 1–17) for arrests with a non-cardiac cause, provision by bystanders of conventional CPR with rescue breathing yielded a favorable neurological outcome at one month more often than did compression-only CPR (OR 5.54). For arrests with a cardiac cause in this cohort, there was no difference between the two techniques (OR 1.20). This is consistent with American Heart Association guidelines for parents.

When done by trained responders, 30 compressions interrupted by two breaths appears to have a slightly better result than continuous chest compressions with breaths being delivered while compressions are ongoing.

Measurement of end-tidal carbon dioxide during CPR reflects cardiac output and can predict chances of ROSC.

In a study of in-hospital CPR from 2000 to 2008, 59% of CPR survivors lived over a year after hospital discharge and 44% lived over 3 years.

Consequences
Performing CPR is advised as an urgent intervention, for when a person is not breathing and therefore would certainly die without it.

Survival rates: In US hospitals in 2017, 26% of patients who received CPR survived to hospital discharge.

In 2017 in the US, outside hospitals, 16% of people whose cardiac arrest was witnessed survived to hospital discharge.

Since 2003, widespread cooling of patients after CPR
and other improvements have raised survival and reduced mental disabilities.

Organ donation
Organ donation is usually made possible by CPR, even if CPR does not save the patient. If there is a return of spontaneous circulation (ROSC), all organs can be considered for donation. If the patient does not achieve ROSC, and CPR continues until an operating room is available, the kidneys and liver can still be considered for donation.
1,000 organs per year in the US are transplanted from patients who had CPR.
Donations can be taken from 40% of patients who have ROSC and later become brain dead.
Up to 8 organs can be taken from each donor,
and an average of 3 organs are taken from each patient who donates organs.

Mental abilities
Mental abilities are about the same for survivors before and after CPR for 89% of patients, based on before and after counts of 12,500 US patients' Cerebral-Performance Category (CPC) codes in a 2000–2009 study of CPR in hospitals. 1% more survivors were in comas than before CPR. 5% more needed help with daily activities. 5% more had moderate mental problems and could still be independent.

For CPR outside hospitals, a Copenhagen study of 2,504 patients in 2007-2011 found 21% of survivors developed moderate mental problems but could still be independent, and 11% of survivors developed severe mental problems, so they needed daily help. Two patients out of 2,504 went into comas (0.1% of patients, or 2 out of 419 survivors, 0.5%), and the study did not track how long the comas lasted.

Most people in comas start to recover in 2–3 weeks. 2018 guidelines on disorders of consciousness say it is no longer appropriate to use the term "permanent vegetative state." Mental abilities can continue to improve in the six months after discharge, and in subsequent years. For long-term problems, brains form new paths to replace damaged areas.

Injuries
Injuries from CPR vary. 87% of patients are not injured by CPR. Overall, injuries are caused in 13% (2009–12 data) of patients, including broken sternum or ribs (9%), lung injuries (3%), and internal bleeding (3%).
The internal injuries counted here can include heart contusion, hemopericardium, upper airway complications, damage to the abdominal viscera − lacerations of the liver and spleen, fat emboli, pulmonary complications − pneumothorax, hemothorax, lung contusions. Most injuries did not affect care; only 1% of those given CPR received life-threatening injuries from it.

Broken ribs are present in 3%
of those who survive to hospital discharge, and 15% of those who die in the hospital, for an average rate of 9% (2009-12 data)
to 8% (1997–99).
In the 2009-12 study, 20% of survivors were older than 75. A study in the 1990s found 55% of CPR patients who died before discharge had broken ribs, and a study in the 1960s found 97% did; training and experience levels have improved. Lung injuries were caused in 3% of patients and other internal bleeding in 3% (2009–12).

Bones heal in 1–2 months.

The costal cartilage also breaks in an unknown number of additional cases, which can sound like breaking bones.

The type and frequency of injury can be affected by factors such as sex and age. A 1999 Austrian study of CPR on cadavers, using a machine which alternately compressed the chest then pulled it outward, found a higher rate of sternal fractures in female cadavers (9 of 17) than male (2 of 20), and found the risk of rib fractures rose with age, though they did not say how much.
Children and infants have a low risk of rib fractures during CPR, with an incidence less than 2%, although, when they do occur, they are usually anterior and multiple.

Where CPR is performed in error by a bystander, on a person not in cardiac arrest, around 2% have injury as a result (although 12% experienced discomfort).

A 2004 overview said, "Chest injury is a price worth paying to achieve optimal efficacy of chest compressions. Cautious or faint-hearted chest compression may save bones in the individual case but not the patient's life."

Other side effects
The most common side effect is vomiting, which necessitates clearing the mouth so patients do not breathe it in.
It happened in 16 of 35 CPR efforts in a 1989 study in King County, WA, USA.

Survival differences, based on prior illness, age or location
The American Heart Association guidelines say that survival rates below 1% are "futility," but all groups have better survival than that. Even among very sick patients at least 10% survive: A study of CPR in a sample of US hospitals from 2001 to 2010, where overall survival was 19%, found 10% survival among cancer patients, 12% among dialysis patients, 14% over age 80, 15% among blacks, 17% for patients who lived in nursing homes, 19% for patients with heart failure, and 25% for patients with heart monitoring outside the ICU.
Another study, of advanced cancer patients, found the same 10% survival mentioned above.
A study of Swedish patients in 2007–2015 with ECG monitors found 40% survived at least 30 days after CPR at ages 70–79, 29% at ages 80–89, and 27% above age 90.

An earlier study of Medicare patients in hospitals 1992–2005, where overall survival was 18%, found 13% survival in the poorest neighborhoods, 12% survival over age 90, 15% survival among ages 85–89, and 17% survival among ages 80–84.
Swedish patients 90 years or older had 15% survival to hospital discharge, 80-89 had 20%, and 70-79 had 28%.

A study of King County WA patients who had CPR outside hospitals in 1999–2003, where 34% survived to hospital discharge overall, found that among patients with 4 or more major medical conditions, 18% survived; with 3 major conditions 24% survived, and 33% of those with 2 major medical conditions survived.

Nursing home residents' survival has been studied by several authors,

and is measured annually by the Cardiac Arrest Registry to Enhance Survival (CARES). CARES reports CPR results from a catchment area of 115 million people, including 23 state-wide registries, and individual communities in 18 other states as of 2019. CARES data show that in health care facilities and nursing homes where AEDs are available and used, survival rates are double the average survival found in nursing homes overall.

Geographically, there is wide variation state-to-state in survival after CPR in US hospitals, from 40% in Wyoming to 20% in New York, so there is room for good practices to spread, raising the averages.
For CPR outside hospitals, survival varies even more across the US, from 3% in Omaha to 45% in Seattle in 2001. This study only counted heart rhythms which can respond to defibrillator shocks (tachycardia).
A major reason for the variation has been delay in some areas between the call to emergency services and the departure of medics, and then arrival and treatment. Delays were caused by lack of monitoring, and the mismatch between recruiting people as firefighters, though most emergency calls they are assigned to are medical, so staff resisted and delayed on the medical calls. Building codes have cut the number of fires, but staff still think of themselves as firefighters.

Dysthanasia
In some instances CPR can be considered a form of dysthanasia.

Prevalence

Chance of receiving CPR
Various studies show that in out-of-home cardiac arrest, bystanders in the US attempt CPR in between 14% and 45% of the time, with a median of 32%. Globally, rates of bystander CPR reported to be as low as 1% and as high as 44%. However, the effectiveness of this CPR is variable, and the studies suggest only around half of bystander CPR is performed correctly. One study found that members of the public having received CPR training in the past lack the skills and confidence needed to save lives. The report's authors suggested that better training is needed to improve the willingness to respond to cardiac arrest. Factors that influence bystander CPR in out-of-hospital cardiac arrest include:
 Affordable training.
 Target CPR training to family members of potential cardiac arrest
 CPR classes should be simplified and shortened.
 Offer reassurance and education about CPR.
 Provide clearer information about legal implications for specific regions.
 Focus on reducing the stigma and fears around providing bystander CPR.
There is a relation between age and the chance of CPR being commenced. Younger people are far more likely to have CPR attempted on them before the arrival of emergency medical services. Bystanders more commonly administer CPR when in public than when at the person's home, although health care professionals are responsible for more than half of out-of-hospital resuscitation attempts. People with no connection to the person are more likely to perform CPR than are a member of their family.

There is also a clear relation between the cause of arrest and the likelihood of a bystander initiating CPR. Laypersons are most likely to give CPR to younger people in cardiac arrest in a public place when it has a medical cause; those in arrest from trauma, exsanguination or intoxication are less likely to receive CPR.

It is believed that there is a higher chance that CPR will be performed if the bystander is told to perform only the chest compression element of the resuscitation.

The first formal study into gender bias in receiving CPR from the public versus professionals was conducted by the American Heart Association and the National Institutes of Health (NIH), and examined nearly 20,000 cases across the U.S. The study found that women are six percent less likely than men to receive bystander CPR when in cardiac arrest in a public place, citing the disparity as "likely due to the fear of being falsely accused of sexual assault."

Chance of receiving CPR in time
CPR is likely to be effective only if commenced within 6 minutes after the blood flow stops because permanent brain cell damage occurs when fresh blood infuses the cells after that time, since the cells of the brain become dormant in as little as 4–6 minutes in an oxygen deprived environment and, therefore, cannot survive the reintroduction of oxygen in a traditional resuscitation. Research using cardioplegic blood infusion resulted in a 79.4% survival rate with cardiac arrest intervals of 72±43 minutes, traditional methods achieve a 15% survival rate in this scenario, by comparison. New research is currently needed to determine what role CPR, defibrillation, and new advanced gradual resuscitation techniques will have with this new knowledge.

A notable exception is cardiac arrest that occurs in conjunction with exposure to very cold temperatures. Hypothermia seems to protect by slowing down metabolic and physiologic processes, greatly decreasing the tissues' need for oxygen. There are cases where CPR, defibrillation, and advanced warming techniques have revived victims after substantial periods of hypothermia.

Society and culture

Portrayed effectiveness
CPR is often severely misrepresented in movies and television as being highly effective in resuscitating a person who is not breathing and has no circulation.

A 1996 study published in the New England Journal of Medicine showed that CPR success rates in television shows was 75% for immediate circulation, and 67% survival to discharge. This gives the general public an unrealistic expectation of a successful outcome. When educated on the actual survival rates, the proportion of patients over 60 years of age desiring CPR should they have a cardiac arrest drops from 41% to 22%.

Training and stage CPR

It is dangerous to perform CPR on a person who is breathing normally. These chest compressions create significant local blunt trauma, risking bruising or fracture of the sternum or ribs. If a patient is not breathing, these risks still exist but are dwarfed by the immediate threat to life. For this reason, training is always done with a mannequin, such as the well-known Resusci Anne model.

The portrayal of CPR technique on television and film often is purposely incorrect. Actors simulating the performance of CPR may bend their elbows while appearing to compress, to prevent force from reaching the chest of the actor portraying the patient.

Self-CPR hoax
A form of "self-CPR" termed "cough CPR" was the subject of a hoax chain e-mail entitled "How to Survive a Heart Attack When Alone," which wrongly cited "ViaHealth Rochester General Hospital" as the source of the technique. Rochester General Hospital has denied any connection with the technique.

"Cough CPR" in the sense of resuscitating oneself is impossible because a prominent symptom of cardiac arrest is unconsciousness, which makes coughing impossible.

The American Heart Association (AHA) and other resuscitation bodies do not endorse "cough CPR", which it terms a misnomer as it is not a form of resuscitation. The AHA does recognize a limited legitimate use of the coughing technique: "This coughing technique to maintain blood flow during brief arrhythmias has been useful in the hospital, particularly during cardiac catheterization. In such cases the patient's ECG is monitored continuously, and a physician is present." When coughing is used on trained and monitored patients in hospitals, it has been shown to be effective only for 90 seconds.

Learning from film
In at least one case, it has been alleged that CPR learned from a film was used to save a person's life. In April 2011, it was claimed that nine-year-old Tristin Saghin saved his sister's life by administering CPR on her after she fell into a swimming pool, using only the knowledge of CPR that he had gleaned from a motion picture, Black Hawk Down.

Hands-only CPR portrayal
Less than 1/3 of those people who experience a cardiac arrest at home, work or in a public location have CPR performed on them. Most bystanders are worried that they might do something wrong. On October 28, 2009, the American Heart Association and the Ad Council launched a hands-only CPR public service announcement and website as a means to address this issue. In July 2011, new content was added to the website including a digital app that helps a user learn how to perform hands-only CPR.

History

In the 19th century, Doctor H. R. Silvester described a method (the Silvester method) of artificial ventilation in which the patient is laid on their back, and their arms are raised above their head to aid inhalation and then pressed against their chest to aid exhalation. Another technique, called the Holger Nielsen technique, described in the first edition of the Boy Scout Handbook in the United States in 1911, was a form of artificial ventilation where the person was laid face down, with their head to the side, resting on the palms of both hands.

It was not until the middle of the 20th century that the wider medical community started to recognize and promote artificial ventilation in the form of mouth-to-mouth resuscitation combined with chest compressions as a key part of resuscitation following cardiac arrest. The combination was first seen in a 1962 training video called "The Pulse of Life" created by James Jude, Guy Knickerbocker, and Peter Safar. Jude and Knickerbocker, along with William Kouwenhoven and Joseph S. Redding had recently discovered the method of external chest compressions, whereas Safar had worked with Redding and James Elam to prove the effectiveness of mouth-to-mouth resuscitation. The first effort at testing the technique was performed on a dog by Redding, Safar and JW Pearson. Soon afterward, the technique was used to save the life of a child. Their combined findings were presented at the annual Maryland Medical Society meeting on September 16, 1960, in Ocean City, and gained widespread acceptance over the following decade, helped by the video and speaking tour they undertook. Peter Safar wrote the book ABC of Resuscitation in 1957. In the U.S., it was first promoted as a technique for the public to learn in the 1970s.

Mouth-to-mouth resuscitation was combined with chest compressions based on the assumption that active ventilation is necessary to keep circulating blood oxygenated, and the combination was accepted without comparing its effectiveness with chest compressions alone. However, research in the 2000s demonstrated that assumption to be in error, resulting in the American Heart Association's acknowledgment of the effectiveness of chest compressions alone (see Compression only in this article).

CPR methods continued to advance, with developments in the 2010s including an emphasis on constant, rapid heart stimulation, and a de-emphasis on the respiration aspect. Studies have shown that people who had rapid, constant heart-only chest compression are 22% more likely to survive than those receiving conventional CPR that included breathing. Because people tend to be reluctant to do mouth-to-mouth resuscitation, chest-only CPR nearly doubles the chances of survival overall, by increasing the odds of receiving CPR in the first place.

On animals
It is feasible to perform CPR on animals, including cats and dogs. The principles and practices are similar to CPR for humans, except that resuscitation is usually done through the animal's nose, not the mouth. CPR should only be performed on unconscious animals to avoid the risk of being bitten; a conscious animal would not require chest compressions. Animals, depending on species, may have a lower bone density than humans and so CPR can cause bones to become weakened after it is performed.

Research
Cerebral performance category (CPC scores) are used as a research tool to describe "good" and "poor" outcomes. Level 1 is conscious and alert with normal function. Level 2 is only slight disability. Level 3 is moderate disability. Level 4 is severe disability. Level 5 is comatose or persistent vegetative state. Level 6 is brain dead or death from other causes.

See also 
 Advance healthcare directive
 Automated external defibrillator (AED)
 Impedance threshold device
 Lazarus syndrome, spontaneous autoresuscitation where attempts at artificial resuscitation have failed
 Slow code

References

Further reading

External links 

 CPR: NHS Choices
 How to resuscitate a child: NHS Choices

 
Articles containing video clips